Selah Tuthill (October 26, 1771September 7, 1821) was an American politician from New York.

Life

Tuthill attended public and private schools.

He was a member of the New York State Assembly from Ulster County in 1804–05, and from Orange County in 1820.

In April 1821, Tuthill was elected to the 17th United States Congress Congress but died before he could take his seat. The congressional elections were held this time after the congressional term had already begun on March 4, and it is uncertain if Tuthill ever received his credentials. Congress met on December 3, 1821, and Charles Borland, Jr., who had been elected in the meanwhile in a special election, took this seat.

He was a Freemason. He was a founding member of Columbia Lodge No 207 in New Paltz, New York

Tuthill was interred in Riverside Cemetery in Marlboro, New York.

Congressman Joseph H. Tuthill was his nephew.

Sources

1771 births
1821 deaths
People from Blooming Grove, New York
People from Ulster County, New York
Members of the New York State Assembly
Democratic-Republican Party members of the United States House of Representatives from New York (state)